Alvania sculptilis is a species of minute sea snail, a marine gastropod mollusk or micromollusk in the family Rissoidae.

Taxonomy
There is also the Australian marine species  Alvania sculptilis (May, 1920) (synonym and basionym: Merelina sculptilis May, 1920 ), a junior secondary homonym of Alvania sculptilis (Monterosato, 1877). However, the genus Alvania as currently used has a very broad taxonomic extension, and these two species may very well end up in different genera when a robust phylogeny becomes available. For the time being, it is thus advisable to keep using the invalid name Alvania sculptilis (May, 1920) for the Australian species.

Description

Distribution
This rare species occurs in European waters (the Mediterranean Sea off Algiers)

References

 Gofas, S.; Le Renard, J.; Bouchet, P. (2001). Mollusca, in: Costello, M.J. et al. (Ed.) (2001). European register of marine species: a check-list of the marine species in Europe and a bibliography of guides to their identification. Collection Patrimoines Naturels, 50: pp. 180–213

Rissoidae
Gastropods described in 1877